"Treehouse of Horror XXVII" is the fourth episode of the twenty-eighth season of the American animated television series The Simpsons, the 27th episode in the Treehouse of Horror series of Halloween specials, and the 600th episode of the series overall. It aired in the United States on Fox on October 16, 2016.

Plot
The episode opens with the Simpsons in their Halloween costumes with Homer dressed as Bender, Maggie as Charlie Chaplin, Lisa as a recycle-bin and Bart as a pterodactyl visiting a Christmas tree lot early on Halloween, only to be locked in and ambushed by Sideshow Bob, the leprechaun from Treehouse of Horror XII, the ghost of Frank Grimes, and Kang. The living members of the revenge group are killed by Maggie Simpson acting as a parody of Alex DeLarge while Frank Grimes' ghost is livid. The blood from the members spells the title of the episode. Scenes from every preceding episode are displayed as Frank Grimes' ghost notes that Hell runs a non-stop 600 episode marathon of the Simpsons, explaining to the viewers "in Hell, they make you watch all of them in a row?". Next in a couch gag parodying Planet of the Apes, viewable with Google Cardboard for special content, the Simpson family are captured on a planet populated by living couches, before being rescued by their generic brown couch, which they knock unconscious and proceed to sit on.

Dry Hard
In a four-part parody of The Hunger Games and Mad Max: Fury Road, Mr. Burns controls the last of the water supply in a severely drought-stricken Springfield. He makes an announcement to have the children battle each other to the death in a dome with the survivor allowed to spend a day swimming in his personal reservoir. Lisa Simpson is the selected child from the Nevergreen Terrace neighborhood with Homish as her coach, eventually convincing the population of Springfield to turn against Mr. Burns. But the group immediately regret destroying the reservoir as the water is completely wasted. The people of the town think they are saved when a rain storm starts. However, the storm results in a flood and later an ice age.

BFF R.I.P.
Lisa is playing hide and seek with Janey before the latter is killed by a lawn mower. At Janey's funeral, Sherri and Terri decide to let Lisa be their friend before they are immediately crushed by a falling tombstone. After Lisa's therapist is also killed under mysterious circumstances, Chief Wiggum suspects her to be the murderer, and Lisa realizes her imaginary friend, "Rachel" (voiced by Sarah Silverman) has returned and is killing anyone close to her so she can be Lisa's only friend. The next day on the school bus, Milhouse Van Houten is asphyxiated by Rachel, and Lisa is arrested for the murder. In jail, Lisa mentions that her mother was right about Rachel, which convinces her to kill Marge Simpson and everyone Lisa cares about. But after Lisa escapes jail with Bart's help, she confronts Rachel as she plans to kill Marge. Homer can see Rachel because he is drunk, and his imaginary friend Sergeant Sausage attempts to defeat Rachel but is killed. Lisa manages to drive off Rachel by threatening to use her imagination on her to turn her into a middle-aged woman and marrying her to a dentist and she fades never to be seen again. The final scene has Homer eating the remains of "Sergeant Sausage", who reappears and states that imaginary friends cannot die.

MoeFinger
In a parody of Goldfinger and Kingsman: The Secret Service, Bart is saved from Jimbo, Dolph and Kearney by Moe Szyslak, who reveals that he and his regular barflies are actually secret agents and asks Bart to take the place of Homer, who is assumed to have died in action. They later receive intel that all the world's beer has been bought by Remoh Industries, a multibillion-dollar company that is hosting a free Steely Dan concert at the recently bought Duff Stadium. The group sneak into the stadium and learn that Remoh's CEO is Homer, who had bought the beer to celebrate when the lava machine he built makes all the world surrender to him. When the agents are going to attack Homer, he sends a horde of mind-controlled groupies to fight them with Bart the only survivor. Bart manages to kill his own father.

As the song "600" is performed by Judith Owen, the viewers are shown the names of Fox's cancelled shows like Drexell's Class, Babes, Herman's Head, Woops!, Too Something, House of Buggin', Sit Down, Shut Up, Celebrity Boxing, The Littlest Groom, Man Vs. Beast, Allen Gregory, The Critic, Futurama, and the at-the-time upcoming project, The Orville.

Reception
The episode received mixed reviews. Dennis Perkins of The A.V. Club gave it a B− stating, "While the annual 'Treehouse of Horror' episodes traditionally get decent ratings, and have produced some classic scenes over the decades, the expectations are lower regarding character development, plot, or general coherence. The Simpsons Halloween tradition is for quick-hit horror and sci-fi parodies, a heap of references, some gratuitous bloodshed, and the occasional actual smidgen of heart. Grading on that curve, the 27th installment does its job, for the most part."

However, Jesse Schedeen of IGN gave it a score of 5.8 out of 10, saying, "Last year's 'Halloween of Horror' proved that The Simpsons can still deliver great Halloween-themed fare. Unfortunately, the latest 'Treehouse of Horror' installment is far from great. Only one of the three segments is particularly memorable, and even that feels constrained by the seven-minute structure. The time has come for this long-running series to become more experimental with its Halloween episodes."

"Treehouse of Horror XXVII" scored a 3.0 rating with a 10 share and was watched by 7.44 million people, making The Simpsons Fox's highest rated show of the night.

References

External links

2016 American television episodes
Dystopian television episodes
The Simpsons (season 28) episodes
Treehouse of Horror
Halloween television episodes